Curcuris is a comune (municipality) in the Province of Oristano in the Italian region Sardinia, located about  northwest of Cagliari and about  southeast of Oristano.

Curcuris borders the following municipalities: Ales, Gonnosnò, Morgongiori, Pompu, Simala.

References

Cities and towns in Sardinia